David López may refer to:
 David López (footballer, born 1956), Spanish footballer
 David López (artist) (born 1975), Spanish comic book artist
 David López (cyclist) (born 1981), Spanish road racing cyclist
 David López (footballer, born 1982), Spanish footballer
 David López (footballer, born 1989), Spanish footballer
 David López Ribes (born 1972), Spanish painter and multidisciplinary artist
 David Alonso López (1977–2017), Mexican boxer

See also
 David Lopes (born 1982), Brazilian footballer